Malthonea is a genus of longhorn beetles of the subfamily Lamiinae, found in South America:

Species
These 17 species belong to the genus Malthonea:

 Malthonea albomaculata (Breuning, 1966)  (Bolivia)
 Malthonea aurescens (Breuning, 1966)  (Ecuador)
 Malthonea cumbica Galileo & Martins, 1996  (Venezuela)
 Malthonea cuprascens (Waterhouse, 1880)  (Ecuador, Peru)
 Malthonea glaucina (Thomson, 1868)  (Ecuador, Venezuela)
 Malthonea guttata (Kirsch, 1889)  (Colombia, Ecuador)
 Malthonea itaiuba Martins & Galileo, 1999  (Venezuela)
 Malthonea keili Santos-Silva, Galileo & McClarin, 2018  (Ecuador)
 Malthonea mimula Martins & Galileo, 1995  (Colombia)
 Malthonea minima Martins & Galileo, 1995  (Peru)
 Malthonea obyuna Martins & Galileo, 2005  (Peru)
 Malthonea panthera Martins & Galileo, 1995  (Colombia, Venezuela)
 Malthonea phantasma Martins & Galileo, 1995  (Ecuador)
 Malthonea piraiuba Martins & Galileo, 2009  (Costa Rica)
 Malthonea ruficornis Belon, 1903  (Bolivia, Ecuador)
 Malthonea spinosa Galileo & Martins, 1999  (Colombia)
 Malthonea tigrinata Thomson, 1864  (Argentina, Brazil)

References

Desmiphorini